Gweru-Thornhill Air Base  is one of the two main air bases of the Air Force of Zimbabwe located near the central city of Gweru,

Thornhill Air Base is home to air force fighter squadrons and the Pilot Training School. According to Janes Defence Weekly of 6 September 2006 a US$41.5m simulation center was being established. A full range of amenities and services, which include workshops, transport fleets, equipment depots, and accommodation, sporting and entertainment facilities, support the base.

It is home to these squadrons:
 No. 2 Squadron (Cobra) - for advanced jet training and close air support. Operates 12 K-8s.
 No. 4 Squadron (Hornet) - equipped with Cessna FTB337G and O-2A
 No. 5 Squadron (Arrow) - interceptor/fighter role with Chengdu F-7 II/IIN and Guizhou FT-7BZ.
 No. 6 Squadron (Tiger) - with SF-260M, SF-260TP and SF-260W

See also
Transport in Zimbabwe
List of airports in Zimbabwe

References

External links
OurAirports - Gweru-Thornhill
SkyVector Aeronautical Charts

Air Force of Zimbabwe
Airports in Zimbabwe
Zimbabwean airbases
Buildings and structures in Midlands Province